This is a list of American television series whose production was impacted by the COVID-19 pandemic. The pandemic led to the suspension of most television production from mid-March 2020 onward, in the largest disruption to U.S. television production since the 2007–08 Writers Guild of America strike.

Production suspended, postponed and/or modified 
These tables include series that adopted remotely-filmed and home-based productions for one or more episodes, or resumed studio-based production with additional safety protocols, such as reduced staff, lack of studio audience, alternate locations, and/or visible social distancing.

Unscripted

Scripted

Talk shows

Sports entertainment

Animated

Seasons ended prematurely

Unscripted and talk shows

Scripted

New thematic programming produced in the wake of the pandemic 
This includes series that are set during the pandemic, or are otherwise designed around remote/at-home production.

Series cancelled due to factors brought upon by the pandemic

References 

2020 in American television
American
Television
C
American
American